Diego Karg (born 9 August 1990 in Arnhem) is a Dutch professional footballer who plays as a striker. He formerly played for FC Den Bosch, Telstar and FC Eindhoven.

External links
 Voetbal International profile 

1990 births
Living people
Dutch footballers
FC Den Bosch players
SC Telstar players
FC Eindhoven players
Eerste Divisie players
Footballers from Arnhem
Association football forwards